The Intermediate League World Series Canada Region is one of six International regions that currently sends teams to the World Series in Livermore, California. The region's participation in the ILWS dates back to 2013.

Canada Region Provinces

Region Champions
As of the 2022 Intermediate League World Series.

Results by Province
As of the 2022 Intermediate League World Series.

See also

Canada Region in other Little League divisions
Little League
Junior League
Senior League
Big League

References

Intermediate League World Series
Canada
Baseball competitions in Canada
Recurring sporting events established in 2013